Gobeil may refer to:

Persons
 Gilles Gobeil (born 1954), electroacoustic music composer residing in Montreal, Canada
 Paul Gobeil (born 1942), Canadian businessman and politician
 Samuel Gobeil, Quebec politician

Places
Gobeil River, a tributary of Big Black River, in Quebec, Canada, and Maine, United States
Lac Gobeil Water Aerodrome, aerodrome located on Lac Gobeil, Quebec, Canada and is open from the middle of May until the middle of November.